Christina Bailey (born February 5, 1972) is an American ice hockey player. She won a gold medal at the 1998 Winter Olympics and a silver medal at the 2002 Winter Olympics. Bailey finished her career with the Providence Friars with 27 goals, 49 assists, and 76 points.

References

External links
 bio

1972 births
American women's ice hockey defensemen
Ice hockey players from New York (state)
Ice hockey players at the 1998 Winter Olympics
Ice hockey players at the 2002 Winter Olympics
Living people
Medalists at the 1998 Winter Olympics
Medalists at the 2002 Winter Olympics
Olympic gold medalists for the United States in ice hockey
Olympic silver medalists for the United States in ice hockey
People from Onondaga County, New York
Providence Friars women's ice hockey players